Lindh is a surname. Notable people with the surname include

Anna Lindh (1957–2003), Swedish politician
Anna Lindh Euro-Mediterranean Foundation for the Dialogue Between Cultures
Anna Lindh Memorial Fund (Swedish: Anna Lindhs Minnesfond)
August Lindh, founder of the Juvenalorden Swedish student society
Björn J:son Lindh, Swedish flautist and composer
Chris Lindh, third and latest lead singer of the Swedish band Barbados
Emil Aleksander Lindh, 19th–20th-century Finnish sailor and olympian
Erik Lindh, Swedish table tennis player
Gustaf Lindh, Swedish Olympic champion in modern pentathlon
Hans Lindh, 1948–1957 champion of the Swedish Figure Skating Championships
Helge Lindh (born 1976), German politician
Hilary Lindh, American alpine ski racer
Hilda Maria Lund (née Lindh), 19th-century Swedish ballerina
Ingemar Lindh, Swedish theatre director and pedagogue
Jan Lindh, Swedish musician, drummer of doom metal band Candlemass
John Walker Lindh, American who joined the Taliban
Lasse Lindh, Swedish indie pop musician
Mats Ingemar Lindh, Swedish professional ice hockey player
Torsten Lindh, Swedish Navy rear admiral
Pär Lindh, Swedish musician
Reza Ningtyas Lindh, competitor in the Swedish Idol 2009 television series

See also
Lind